Kensington is a census-designated place (CDP) and section of the town of Berlin in Hartford County, Connecticut, United States. The Berlin town offices are located in Kensington. The population was 8,459 at the 2010 census.

The Henry Hooker House is a historic home in Kensington.

Geography
Kensington occupies the north-central part of the town of Berlin, centered on the intersection of Connecticut Route 71 (New Britain Road/Main Street) and Connecticut Route 372 (Farmington Avenue). Route 9 and Route 571 bypass Kensington to the north and east.

Demographics
As of the census of 2000, there were 8,541 people, 3,307 households, and 2,374 families residing in the CDP. The racial makeup of the CDP was 96.39% White, 0.23% African American, 0.07% Native American, 2.32% Asian, 0.02% Pacific Islander, 0.22% from other races, and 0.74% from two or more races. Hispanic or Latino of any race were 1.49% of the population.

There were 3,307 households, out of which 31.0% had children under the age of 18 living with them, 60.6% were married couples living together, 8.3% had a female householder with no husband present, and 28.2% were non-families. 24.6% of all households were made up of individuals, and 13.7% had someone living alone who was 65 years of age or older.  The average household size was 2.56 and the average family size was 3.09.

In the CDP, the population was spread out, with 22.9% under the age of 18, 6.1% from 18 to 24, 27.4% from 25 to 44, 25.2% from 45 to 64, and 18.4% who were 65 years of age or older.  The median age was 42 years. For every 100 females, there were 90.9 males.  For every 100 females age 18 and over, there were 88.5 males.

The median income for a household in the CDP was $60,500, and the median income for a family was $73,110. Males had a median income of $45,707 versus $34,167 for females. The per capita income for the CDP was $25,030.  About 1.2% of families and 3.3% of the population were below the poverty line, including 0.9% of those under age 18 and 9.3% of those age 65 or over.

References

Berlin, Connecticut
Census-designated places in Hartford County, Connecticut
Neighborhoods in Connecticut
Census-designated places in Connecticut